The 2008 Formula Nippon Championship was the thirty-sixth season of the premier Japanese open-wheel motor racing series. The series for Formula Nippon racing cars was contested over eight rounds. All teams were required to use Lola chassis (Lola FN06) and have the choice between utilising Mugen Honda (Mugen HF386E) or Toyota (Toyota RV8J) engines.

Defending champion Tsugio Matsuda secured the championship with a round in hand. Together with team mate Benoît Tréluyer, Matsuda's Team Impul also secured the teams championship with a round to go.

Teams and drivers

Calendar

 All races held in Japan.

Championship standings

Drivers' Championship

Scoring system

* – In race 2 at the August Fuji meeting, the race was run behind the safety car for five laps before the race was halted. Half points were awarded.

Teams' Championship

Scoring system

External links
2008 Japanese Championship Formula Nippon

Formula Nippon
Super Formula
Nippon